Vadiabad (also Romanized as Vādīābād; also known as Vādī ʿAbd) is a village in Bandar Charak Rural District, Shibkaveh District, Bandar Lengeh County, Hormozgan Province, Iran. At the 2006 census, its population was 35, in 6 families.

References 

Populated places in Bandar Lengeh County